Kim Myung-Woon (born 1 November 1987) is a South Korean footballer who plays as midfielder for Incheon United.

External links 

1987 births
Living people
South Korean footballers
K League 1 players
Jeonnam Dragons players
Incheon United FC players
Association football midfielders